Expeditie Robinson: 2003, was the fourth Dutch/Belgian version of the Swedish show Expedition Robinson, or Survivor as it is referred to in some countries. This season began airing on September 13, 2003 and concluded on December 6, 2003. The major twist this season was that the team tribes were divided up by gender with the Timo tribe (South Team) initially being composed of seven males and one female, while the Pantai tribe (North Team) was composed of seven females and one male. As the only member of their gender on their respective tribes, Björn Lemeire and Fatima Aboulouafa were made leaders of their tribes and given immunity at their tribes first tribal council. A shocking discovery was made in episode 4 when Fatima was forced to leave the competition as it had been discovered that she was four months pregnant. In the same episode a tribal swap took place in which Giovani Oosters and Judge Chambliss from the Pantai tribe and Jutta Borms and Karen Vanautgaerden swapped tribes. In episode 7, the two tribes merged into a new tribe called Kelapa. Another twist occurred in episode 7 when following the merge and Karen's elimination, she was told that instead of just being eliminated all eliminated from then on would face off at "Devils Island", where they would take part in a series of duels. The winner of the final duel would then re-enter the game at the final three. The winner of the final duel was Ilona Laan. Ultimately, it was Jutta Borms from Belgium who won the season over Judge Chambliss from the Netherlands with an initial jury vote of 4-4, which was eventually broken by a public jury vote in which the public voted in favor of making Jutta the winner with 66% of the vote.

Finishing order

Future Appearances
Björn Lemeire, Ryan van Esch and Ilona van der Laan returned to compete in Expeditie Robinson: Battle of the Titans which van Esch won.

Voting history

 Due to Fatima's evacuation in episode 4, no one was eliminated at the fourth tribal council. However, as Eric received the most votes at tribal council he was given a penalty vote at his tribes next tribal council.

 At the fifth tribal council both Eva and Judge received three votes. As the leader of the tribe, Björn was asked to cast the deciding vote.

 Due to Eric's voluntary exit in episode 6, no one was eliminated at the sixth tribal council. However, as Robin received the most votes at tribal council he was given a penalty vote at the next tribal council.

 At the ninth tribal council both Björn and Ryan received four votes. Because Björn had received more votes since the merge he was eliminated.

 In episode 11, the contestants competed in a reward challenge in which the winner would be allowed a second vote to cast at tribal council. Robin won the challenge.

 As there was initially a tie at the final tribal council, the public was given the right to cast the deciding vote through the results of a poll.

External links
http://worldofbigbrother.com/Survivor/BN/4/about.shtml
https://web.archive.org/web/20100824022356/http://www.expeditie-robinson.tv/vorigeseizoenen/expeditierobinson2003/

Expeditie Robinson seasons
2003 Dutch television seasons
2003 Belgian television seasons